Soldier's Lullaby is a 2018 Serbian drama film directed by Predrag Antonijević.

References

External links 

2018 drama films
Serbian drama films
Films set in Serbia